Shyama Charan Tripura is an Indian politician and social activist from Tripura. He was a Member of Legislative Assembly (MLA) representing Chawamanu in 1998 and 2003. He won from Chhawmanu twice and from Santibazar for one time as a Member of Legislative Assembly(MLA).

He was an active voice for tribal rights.

He was the founder of Tripura Upajati Juba Samiti and Indigenous People's Front of Tripura along with Harinath Debbarma.

References

Members of the Tripura Legislative Assembly
1939 births
2010 deaths